Kuznetsovskaya is a rural locality (a village) in Nyuksenskoye Rural Settlement, Nyuksensky District, Vologda Oblast, Russia. The population was 3 as of 2002.

Geography 
Kuznetsovskaya is located 13 km northwest of Nyuksenitsa (the district's administrative centre) by road. Zaborye is the nearest rural locality.

References 

Rural localities in Nyuksensky District